John William Wall (6 November 1910 – 11 April 1989), pen name Sarban, was a British writer and diplomat. Wall's diplomatic career lasted more than thirty years, but his writing career as Sarban was brief and not prolific, ending during the early 1950s. Sarban is described in The Encyclopedia of Fantasy as "a subtle, literate teller of tales, conscious of the darker and less acceptable implications that underlie much popular literature". Wall cited the supernatural fiction of Arthur Machen and Walter de la Mare as influences on his work.

Early life
Wall was born in Mexborough in Yorkshire, the son of George William Wall, a passenger guard on the Great Central Railway, and Maria Ellen (née Moffatt) Wall. After Mexborough School, he studied English at Jesus College, Cambridge and received first-class honors.  He also studied Arabic and took the Consular Service Examination.

Wall married Eleanor Alexander Riesle on 20 January 1950 and they had one daughter.  Wall and his wife were separated legally during 1971.

Diplomatic service
He chose a diplomatic career in the Near East because "[James Elroy] Flecker, whose poetry I had loved in my school days, had been in the Levant Consular Service", and owing to "a liking for travel and oriental philology". During 1933, Wall was posted initially as Probationer Vice-Consul at Beirut, Lebanon. Subsequently, he was stationed at Jeddah in Saudi Arabia, Tabriz and  Esfahan in Iran, and Casablanca in Morocco. He was posted as the first Political Agent to the Trucial States in Dubai following the relocation of the seat of British representative from Sharjah to Dubai in 1953. After WWII, he was Counsellor at the British Middle East Office in Cairo until 1952.  He was British Ambassador to Paraguay 1957-8 and Consul-General at Alexandria 1963-5. He was honoured in 1953 as a Companion of the Order of St Michael & St George for his diplomatic work.

Wall continued to work for the Foreign Office, at first in a teaching position in London, 1966–1970, and then at the Government Communications Headquarters, a secret surveillance centre, in Cheltenham.  Wall retired from the Foreign Office during 1977, and retired to Monmouthshire.

Literary works
Sarban's most famous literary work is the alternative-history novel The Sound of His Horn (1952), which presupposes that the Nazis have won the Second World War and built parks where they hunt genetically altered humans for sport. Sarban also published two collections of fantasy stories: Ringstones and Other Curious Tales (1951) and The Doll Maker and Other Tales of the Uncanny (1953).

The Sacrifice and Other Stories (2002) collects four novellas, two of which, the title story and "The Sea-Things", appeared in print for the first time, while "Number Fourteen" had been published in a later edition of Ringstones, and "The King of the Lake" had been added to a later edition of The Sound of His Horn.

Further previously unpublished work, including poems, a one-act play, extracts from two novels and unpublished stories, has been collected in Discovery of Heretics (2010).

Bibliography
Ringstones and Other Curious Tales, Peter Davies, 1951
also Tartarus Press, 2000 (350 copies; adds "Number Fourteen")
The Sound of His Horn, Peter Davies, 1952
also Tartarus Press, 1999 (350 numbered copies; adds "The King of the Lake")
The Doll Maker Other Tales of the Uncanny, Peter Davies, 1953. Note: The Ballantine paperback reprint (1960) omits two stories.
The Sacrifice, Tartarus Press, 2002 (350 copies)
Discovery of Heretics, Tartarus Press, 2011

References

 Sullivan, Jack (1986) "Sarban" The Penguin encyclopedia of horror and the supernatural Viking, New York, N.Y., USA, 
 Chapman, E. L. (2002) "Sarban (John W. Wall)" In Harris-Fain, Darren (2002) British fantasy and science-fiction writers, 1918-1960 Gale Group, Detroit, 
 Russell, R.B. (2001) "Sarban" The Lost Club Journal

External links
 Sarban.co.uk
 Guide to Supernatural Fiction: Sarban
 Existential Ennui article about "Sarban"
 "Sarban" Fantastic Fiction

English science fiction writers
English horror writers
British alternative history writers
Alumni of Jesus College, Cambridge
People from Mexborough
1910 births
1989 deaths
British consuls-general in Egypt
Ambassadors of the United Kingdom to Paraguay
20th-century English novelists
Weird fiction writers